Zierke is a surname. Notable people with the surname include:

 Ernst Zierke (1905–1972), German member of the Schutzstaffel
 Stefan Zierke (born 1970), German politician

See also
 Ziemke

German-language surnames